East Africa and Uganda Protectorates was the name used by the combined postal service of the British protectorates, British East Africa and Uganda, between 1 April 1903 and 22 July 1920.

East Africa and Uganda Protectorates

The administration issued postage stamps with the profile of King Edward VII and inscribed "EAST AFRICA AND UGANDA PROTECTORATES" in 1903.  The same basic design was used throughout the period, with new watermark and colours in 1904 and 1907, respectively, and the substitution of King George V in 1912.  The 6c stamp was surcharged 4c in 1919.

While the lower-denomination stamps are common, stamps of up to 500 rupees were sold, primarily for use as revenue stamps.  Postal usages of the higher values are scarce and valuable.

Kenya and Uganda

On 23 July 1920 British East Africa became a Crown Colony of Kenya, with the exception of a coastal strip which remained a protectorate. Stamps were then inscribed "KENYA AND UGANDA"

Postal stationery 

The postal administration of East Africa and Uganda issued post paid envelopes, registration envelopes, wrappers, postcards and a telegram sheet. The designs of the imprints on registrations envelopes, newspaper wrappers and postcards were similar to that used on the stamps.

A total of four post paid envelopes were issued, the stamp imprint on all was oval with the head of king. A one anna envelope was issued in 1904, a six cent envelope was issued in 1907 and finally a 6 cent and a 10 cent envelope was issued with the head of King George in 1912.

Including different sizes, a total of eleven registration envelopes have been identified as having been issued; three during the reign of Edward VII and eight during the reign of George V.

Three different wrappers with the Edward VII design were produced and two with George V.

A total of 12 postcards are known to have been issued; eight during the reign of Edward VII and four during the reign of George V.

One unusual item of postal stationery item, issued in 1903, was a telegram sheet with a one rupee stamp imprint. The design of the stamp was hexagonal with the head of Edward VII in a circle in the centre.

See also
Postage stamps and postal history of Kenya, Uganda, Tanganyika
Postage stamps and postal history of Kenya
Postage stamps and postal history of Uganda
Revenue stamps of Kenya

References and sources

References

Sources
Rossiter, Stuart & John Flower. The Stamp Atlas. London: Macdonald, 1986. 
 Scott catalogue

Further reading
 Colley, Bill. East African Airmails to 1939. Hassocks: Pier Point Publishing, 1994 120p.
 Hoffman, Regis. World War I in East Africa: Civil Censorship. Perth: Chavril Press, 2001  23p.
 Mackay, James A. East Africa: The Story of East Africa and its Stamps. London: Philatelic Publishers, Ltd., 1970 192p. Series Title: Collecta handbook ; no. 5.
 Minns, John and Stuart Rossiter. The Cancellations of Kenya, 1890-1963; including British East Africa, the East Africa Protectorate, Kenya. s.l.: East Africa Study Circle, 1991  177p.

Postal system of Kenya
Communications in Uganda
History of Kenya
Uganda Protectorate
East Africa and Uganda Protectorates
East Africa Protectorate